Slovene March may refer to two different geographical-historical administrative entities:
the Windic March in present-day south-east Slovenia;
the Slovene March of the Kingdom of Hungary in present-day north-east Slovenia.

nl:Sloveense Mark
sl:Slovenska krajina